Marlborough Street Training College was a teacher training college in Marlborough Street, Dublin, Ireland. It was established in 1837 by the Commissioners of National Education, for the training of male national school teacher, in 1844 female teachers began to be trained in Marlborough Street. It was a non-denominational institution however it was predominantly presbyterian since the Church of Ireland had Kildare Place, and the Catholic Church had its own colleges.

The buildings of the former training college form part of the Department of Education complex in Marlborough Street, Talbot House  housed female students. In 1908 Marlborough Hall in Glasnevin for male teachers it closed in 1918, Marlborough House, where the Met Office is now located, was for female teachers.

Marlborough Street was closed as a training college, following Irish Independence by Minister of Education Eoin MacNeill in 1922.

References

Former universities and colleges in the Republic of Ireland
Former education schools in Ireland
Educational institutions established in 1837
1837 establishments in Ireland